Jean-Baptiste Philibert Vaillant, 1st Comte Vaillant (6 December 1790 – 4 June 1872), born in Dijon, was a Marshal of France.

Vaillant entered the French army in 1809 in the corps of engineers. He served in the French invasion of Russia (1812) and the next year became a prisoner of war after the Battle of Kulm. During the Hundred Days Vaillant fought at Ligny and Waterloo. Vaillant commanded a battalion in the 1830 campaign against Algiers. Promoted to lieutenant colonel, he served under Gérard in the expedition into Belgium in 1831.

Vaillant commanded the fortress at Algiers from 1837 to 1838, recalled to France, he was made director of the École polytechnique. Promoted to lieutenant general, Vaillant was put in charge of the building of the Parisian fortifications in 1845 under the command of Dode de la Brunerie. In 1849, Vaillant was given command of the engineers in the French expeditionary corps to Rome. Promoted to Marshal of France in 1851, Vaillant served as Minister of War from 1854 to 1859, holding the position throughout the Crimean War.

On the outbreak of the Franco-Austrian War he resigned as Minister of War in order to serve as Chief of Staff to Napoleon III, who took personal command of the French Army. In 1860, Vaillant became minister responsible for the Imperial House and in 1864, he was made Grand Chancellor of the Legion d'Honneur. After the fall of the Second French Empire in September 1870, Vaillant was banished from France but was allowed back, returning in 1871. He died in Paris the next year.

References

1790 births
1872 deaths
Military personnel from Dijon
Counts of France
Bonapartists
French Ministers of Public Education and Religious Affairs
French Ministers of War
French Senators of the Second Empire
Marshals of France
French military personnel of the Napoleonic Wars
Members of the French Academy of Sciences
Honorary Knights Grand Cross of the Order of the Bath